Roberto Larraz (20 August 1898 – 27 November 1978) was an Argentine fencer. He won a bronze medal in the team foil competition at the 1928 Summer Olympics.

References

External links
 

1898 births
1978 deaths
Argentine male fencers
Olympic fencers of Argentina
Fencers at the 1924 Summer Olympics
Fencers at the 1928 Summer Olympics
Fencers at the 1932 Summer Olympics
Fencers at the 1936 Summer Olympics
Olympic bronze medalists for Argentina
Olympic medalists in fencing
Fencers from Buenos Aires
Medalists at the 1928 Summer Olympics